The Lovin' Spoonful Anthology is a compilation album by the folk rock group the Lovin' Spoonful, released in 1990.

The Lovin' Spoonful Anthology focuses mainly on The Lovin' Spoonful's 1965-1966 releases with a few obscure tracks such as "Pow!" from their What's Up, Tiger Lily? soundtrack and "Good Time Music", an early song found on a label sampler. All the band's biggest hits are included as well as a booklet with comments about the songs from John Sebastian.

Reception

In his Allmusic review, music critic Richie Unterberger wrote "Unquestionably the finest collection of a major band that did much to launch American folk-rock in the mid-'60s. Anthology jams 26 cuts onto a single CD, including all of their hits and some of their strongest album tracks, drawing mostly from their 1965-1966 prime."

Track listing
"Good Time Music" (John Sebastian) – 3:06
"Do You Believe In Magic" (Sebastian) – 2:04
"You Didn't Have to Be So Nice" (Steve Boone, Sebastian) – 2:31
"Did You Ever Have to Make Up Your Mind?" (Sebastian) – 1:58
"You Baby" (Mann, Phil Spector, Weil) – 2:55
"Younger Girl" (Sebastian) – 2:19
"Fishin' Blues" Traditional– 2:00
"Daydream" (Sebastian) – 2:18
"Jug Band Music" (Sebastian) – 2:51
"Didn't Want to Have to Do It" (Sebastian) – 2:36
"Summer in the City" (Boone, Sebastian, Mark Sebastian) – 2:39
"Pow!" (Boone, Joe Butler, Sebastian, Zal Yanovsky) – 2:28
"Rain on the Roof" (Sebastian) – 2:11
"Nashville Cats" (Sebastian) – 2:34
"Full Measure" (Boone, Sebastian) – 2:40
"Lovin' You" (Sebastian) – 2:28
"Coconut Grove" (Sebastian, Yanovsky) – 2:42
"Darling Be Home Soon" (Boone, Sebastian) – 3:31
"You're a Big Boy Now" (Boone, Butler, Sebastian) – 2:38
"Lonely (Amy's Theme)" (Sebastian) – 3:19
"Six O'Clock" (Sebastian) – 2:41
"She Is Still a Mystery" (Sebastian) – 3:02
"Money" (Sebastian) – 1:54
"Younger Generation" (Sebastian) – 2:40
"Never Going Back" (John Stewart) – 2:44
"Me About You" (Garry Bonner, Alan Gordon) – 3:48

Personnel
John Sebastian (except tracks 25 and 26) – lead vocals (except tracks 5, 15, 20, 25 and 26), guitar, autoharp
Steve Boone – bass, vocals
Joe Butler – drums, percussion, vocals, lead vocals on tracks 5, 15, 25 and 26
Zal Yanovsky (except tracks 22-26) – guitar, vocals 
Jerry Yester (tracks 22-26) – guitar, vocals

References

The Lovin' Spoonful albums
1990 compilation albums
Rhino Records compilation albums